Saint John County (2016 population: 74,020) is located in southern New Brunswick, Canada. The city of Saint John dominates the county. Elsewhere in the county, tourism is focused around the Bay of Fundy.

Census subdivisions

Communities
There are two municipalities within Saint John County (listed by 2016 population):

Parishes
The county is subdivided by the Territorial Division Act (Section 27) into one city and three parishes (listed by 2016 population):

Demographics

Language

Access Routes
Highways and numbered routes that run through the county, including external routes that start or finish at the county limits:

Highways

Principal Routes

Secondary Routes:

External Routes:
None

Protected areas and attractions

Notable people

See also
List of communities in New Brunswick

References

External links

Saint John County Guide

 
Counties of New Brunswick